My Mother and Other Strangers is a 2016 British television drama series, written by Barry Devlin, made by BBC Northern Ireland with funding from Northern Ireland Screen. The story is set in a small village in Northern Ireland in 1943, during World War II.

Commissioning of the first series of five 60-minute episodes for BBC One was announced in May 2015.  The series began airing on the PBS network in the U.S. in June 2017, as part of PBS' Masterpiece series.
The set stage was in Ballycranbeg Rubane, County Down in Ballycran it was the 2nd main stage 
The main stage was in Kearney, County Down.

Setting 
My Mother and Other Strangers is set in 1943 during the Second World War in the fictional village of Moybeg, on the shores of Lough Neagh, Northern Ireland.  The series centres on the Coyne family and their neighbours, as they come to terms with the influx of thousands of American servicemen of the USAAF Eighth Air Force into their small, rural community. Writer Barry Devlin, who himself grew up in the small village of Ardboe on the shores of Lough Neagh, stated that he wanted to create an "exotic love story" set in the familiar surroundings of a place he recognised.

Characters and actors 
The series has at its core the Coyne family, consisting of Rose Coyne (Hattie Morahan), Michael Coyne (Owen McDonnell), and the Coynes' three children: sixteen-year-old Emma (Eileen O’Higgins); Francis, ten; and Kate, seven.

Also central to the developing story across the five episodes is Captain Dreyfuss (Aaron Staton), a USAAF liaison officer.

The Coynes' neighbours, the Hanlon family, are played by Des McAleer, Seamus O'Hara and Ryan McParland. Charles Lawson plays the parish doctor, Dr Black.

Failey (Kerr Logan) is a local eel fisherman and boyfriend to Sally Quinn (Fiona O’Shaughnessy). She and her brother Barney (Gavin Drea) work on the Coynes' farm.

Director and producers 
The series is directed by Adrian Shergold.

The executive producer is Stephen Wright, Head of Drama for BBC Northern Ireland.

The producer is Grainne Marmion.

References

Further reading
 Review by the television reviewer of The Guardian.

External links 
 
 

Fiction set in 1943
2016 British television series debuts
2016 British television series endings
2010s British drama television series
BBC high definition shows
BBC television dramas
2010s British television miniseries
English-language television shows
Television series set in the 1940s
Television shows set in Northern Ireland
World War II television drama series
Films directed by Adrian Shergold
Television shows scored by Natalie Holt